Tanout is a town in southern Niger. It is in Zinder Region, Tanout Department, north of the city of Zinder.  It is the administrative capital of Tanout Department.

History
Since 1987, the Eden Foundation, an NGO aiming at providing trees for "direct seeding" to households in the surroundings, has been active in the town.

In early 2008, Tanout was the subject of a raid by Tuareg pro-autonomy rebels, in which 11 people, including the mayor, were abducted.

Transport
Tanout Airport serves the town.

References

 Tuareg rebels abduct town's mayor, BBC, 2008.

Zinder Region
Communes of Niger